The following is a list of Philadelphia Phillies broadcasters.

Current broadcasters

Television
 Tom McCarthy, play-by-play announcer (since 2008)
 Scott Franzke, play-by-play announcer (fill-in play-by-play announcer when McCarthy is absent) (since 2022)
 John Kruk, color analyst (since 2017)
 Ben Davis, color analyst (since 2015)
 Rubén Amaro Jr., color analyst (since 2020)
 Mike Schmidt, color analyst (Sunday home games only) (1990, 2014-2019, 2021-present)

Radio
 Scott Franzke, play-by-play announcer (since 2006)
 Tom McCarthy, play-by-play announcer (5th and 6th innings, playoff games only) (since 2022)
 Gregg Murphy, play-by-play announcer and pre/post-game host (fill-in play-by-play announcer when Franzke is absent) (since 2021)
 Larry Andersen, color analyst (since 1998)
 Kevin Stocker, color analyst (2018, 2022–present)

Spanish Radio
 Oscar Budejen, play-by-play announcer (since 2021)
 Bill Kulik, color analyst (since 2005)

Broadcasting history

See also
 Broadcasting of sports events

Notes

References

 
Philadelphia Phillies
Broad
SportsChannel
NBC Sports Regional Networks
Major League Baseball on NBC
CBS Radio Sports